Elke Riesenkönig (born 9 November 1965) is a German rower. She competed in the women's eight event at the 1984 Summer Olympics.

References

External links
 

1965 births
Living people
German female rowers
Olympic rowers of West Germany
Rowers at the 1984 Summer Olympics
Sportspeople from Viña del Mar